Wom ([w̃ɔ̃̀m]), or Perema, is a Leko language of Nigeria.

Phonology
Consonants are:

/ŋ/, and only /ŋ/, appears geminate. /ʔ/ is rare, perhaps borrowed. /h/ is known from one word, not borrowed.

All may be doubled, but there are no long vowels. /a/ is neutralized to /ə/ in all but final position.

Tone is probably high, low, and falling, as in Chamba Leko.

References

External links
 The Perema (Wom) language of northeastern Nigeria: classification, phonology and noun morphology (PDF) by Roger M. Blench, 2000. Mallam Dendo, Cambridge.

Leko languages
Languages of Nigeria
Languages of Cameroon